The Farm of Tomorrow is a 1954 one-reel animated short subject directed by Tex Avery and produced by Fred Quimby. It was released theatrically with the feature filmmovie Rogue Cop on 18 September 1954 and distributed by Metro-Goldwyn-Mayer. The cartoon is one of Avery's future technology cartoons including The House of Tomorrow, The Car of Tomorrow and TV of Tomorrow.

Summary
The narrator (voiced by Paul Frees) introduces the Farm of Tomorrow, a wonderland of modern and mechanical inventions together with the advanced scientifically-improved livestock.

A series of gags showing how much more productive farms would be if farmers started crossbreeding their animals to create weird (but very useful) hybrids.

Each of the inventions and hybrids are explained:

 In the old days, hatching eggs would take 3 weeks. A toaster-like incubator that hatches chicks requires only a few seconds. Set it to dark and the chicks come up black. It is mentioned that caution should be used in setting the selector.
 Another problem in the old days would be the grading of eggs for size. A pinball machine-like egg grader was created for this purpose. One small egg hatches into a small chick as he runs back inside the machine calling for his mom.
 Picking up corn used to waste vast amounts of energy. A corn was crossed with Mexican jumping beans as they jump into the chicken's mouth.
 A chicken was crossed with a talking parrot as the hybrid (voiced by June Foray) lays an egg and shouts "Come and get it"!
 A chicken was crossed with an ostrich to provide bigger drumsticks.
 A chicken was crossed with a centipede to get more drumsticks.
 To increase egg production, a chicken was crossed with a slot machine. A farmer lifts up the chicken's left wing and eggs come out which the farmer collects.
 To guarantee absolute freshness in every egg, a fullproof Smell-O-Meter was created. A rotten egg is detected and discarded where it hatched into a small skunk.
 To solve the fly problem around the dairy, a cow was crossed with a beaver where it uses its beaver tail to swat the flies.
 Milking the cow would take much of the farmer's valuable time. To speed things up, a cow was crossed with a kangaroo as a milkman gets milk bottles from its pouch.
 A silkworm was crossed with a garter snake resulting a beautiful calf.
 The female narrator (voiced by Colleen Collins) talks about how a pig was crossed with a kitchen sink to create a garbage disposal unit for the ladies.
 The female narrator talks about how a shaded buttercup was crossed with a milkweed for a pink cowslip for the female flower lovers.
 Speaking of the new look in poultry, a duck was crossed with a banana. "You don't have to pick him girls, just peel him"!
 No more frostbitten fruit for the citrus farmer because an orange was crossed with a fir tree. This gives the orange a fur coat.
 For the frustrated grocers, a tomato was crossed with a grapefruit to discourage the vegetable-squeezing customers at the grocery store as one female customer gets squirted on.
 An umbrella was crossed with a Christmas tree to solve the annual problem on what to do with a Christmas tree after Christmas.
 For the apartment dweller with limited garden space, a potluck multi-plant was perfected.
 For the sheep ranchers, a lamb was crossed with a dachshund giving it five yards more wool per sheep.
 Sheep shearing has been simplified when a sheep was crossed with a pair of long underwear to produce long underwear-like wool. The farmer uses a plank to knock the sheep out of that wool.
 For the $2.00 betters, a giraffe was crossed with a racehorse. "He's a cinch to win by a neck"! This is seen when the hybrid lowers its neck as the racers approach the finish line.
 A stork was crossed with a stag elk to accommodate the impatient newlyweds who can't wait to have a big family. There are 13 babies being carried in its antlers.

Before ending the cartoon, the male narrator talks to the viewers about the animals in the Reject Barn who are in need of a home. They consist of:

 A dove was crossed with a high chair to make a stool pigeon.
 A  pole was crossed with a cat to make a 10 ft. polecat.
 An owl was crossed with a billy goat to make a hootenanny.

References

External links
 
 The Farm of Tomorrow at the TCM Movie Database

1954 animated films
1954 films
1954 short films
Metro-Goldwyn-Mayer animated short films
Films directed by Tex Avery
1950s American animated films
1950s animated short films
Metro-Goldwyn-Mayer films
Films scored by Scott Bradley
Films with screenplays by Henry Wilson Allen
Films about agriculture
Films about technology
Films set in the future
Hybridisation (biology)
Films produced by Fred Quimby
Metro-Goldwyn-Mayer cartoon studio short films
1950s English-language films